Dounia Issa (born 3 June 1981) is a French retired professional basketball player.  Issa was a member of the French national squad at the EuroBasket 2009 qualification. He is currently head coach of Le Mans of the LNB Pro A.

References

External links
  Dounia Issa at lnb.fr
  Dounia Issa at ffbb.com
 Dounia Issa at fibaeurope.com

1981 births
Living people
BCM Gravelines players
French men's basketball players
JA Vichy players
Le Mans Sarthe Basket coaches
Le Mans Sarthe Basket players
Power forwards (basketball)
Sportspeople from Toulouse